In mathematical logic and computer science the symbol ⊢ has taken the name turnstile because of its resemblance to a typical turnstile if viewed from above. It is also referred to as tee and is often read as "yields", "proves", "satisfies" or "entails".

Interpretations 

The turnstile represents a binary relation. It has several different interpretations in different contexts:

Frege's notation for a judgement of some content 
 
can then be read
I know  is true.
In the same vein, a conditional assertion

can be read as:
From , I know that 
 In metalogic, the study of formal languages; the turnstile represents syntactic consequence (or "derivability"). This is to say, that it shows that one string can be derived from another in a single step, according to the transformation rules (i.e. the syntax) of some given formal system. As such, the expression

Consistent with its use for derivability, a "⊢" followed by an expression without anything preceding it denotes a theorem, which is to say that the expression can be derived from the rules using an empty set of axioms. As such, the expression

means that  is a theorem in the system.
In proof theory, the turnstile is used to denote "provability" or "derivability".

This usage is demonstrated in the article on propositional calculus. The syntactic consequence of provability should be contrasted to semantic consequence, denoted by the double turnstile symbol . For propositional logic, it may be shown that semantic consequence  and derivability  are equivalent to one-another. That is, propositional logic is sound ( implies ) and complete ( implies )
 In sequent calculus, the turnstile is used to denote a sequent. A sequent  asserts that, if all the antecedents  are true, then at least one of the consequents  must be true.
 In the typed lambda calculus, the turnstile is used to separate typing assumptions from the typing judgment.
 In combinatorics,  means that  is a partition of the integer .
 In Hewlett-Packard's HP-41C/CV/CX and HP-42S series of calculators, the symbol (at code point 127 in the FOCAL character set) is called "Append character" and is used to indicate that the following characters will be appended to the alpha register rather than replacing the existing contents of the register. The symbol is also supported (at code point 148) in a modified variant of the HP Roman-8 character set used by other HP calculators.
On other Casio calculators (such as on the Belgian variants—the fx-92B Spéciale Collège and fx-92B Collège 2D calculators—where the decimal separator is represented as a dot instead of a comma), the modulo operator is represented by ÷R instead.

Typography 
In TeX, the turnstile symbol  is obtained from the command . 

In Unicode, the turnstile symbol (⊢) is called right tack and is at code point U+22A2. (Code point U+22A6 is named assertion sign (⊦).) 

 
 = turnstile
 = proves, implies, yields
 = reducible
 
 = reverse turnstile
 = non-theorem, does not yield
  
 ≡ 22A2⊢ 0338$̸ 

On a typewriter, a turnstile can be composed from a vertical bar (|) and a dash (–). 

In LaTeX there is a turnstile package which issues this sign in many ways, and is capable of putting labels below or above it, in the correct places.

Similar graphemes
 ꜔ (U+A714) Modifier Letter Mid Left-Stem Tone Bar
 ├ (U+251C) Box Drawings Light Vertical And Right
 ㅏ (U+314F) Hangul Letter A
 Ͱ (U+0370) Greek Capital Letter Heta
 ͱ (U+0371) Greek Small Letter Heta
 Ⱶ (U+2C75) Latin Capital Letter Half H
 ⱶ (U+2C76) Latin Small Letter Half H
 ⎬ (U+23AC) Right Curly Bracket Middle Piece

See also
 Double turnstile  
 List of logic symbols
 List of mathematical symbols

Notes

References
 
 
  (Lecture notes to a short course at Università degli Studi di Siena, April 1983.)
 
 

Mathematical symbols
Mathematical logic
Logic symbols
Deductive reasoning
Proof theory
Logical consequence